2 Chronicles 22 is the twenty-second chapter of the Second Book of Chronicles the Old Testament in the Christian Bible or of the second part of the Books of Chronicles in the Hebrew Bible. The book is compiled from older sources by an unknown person or group, designated by modern scholars as "the Chronicler", and had the final shape established in late fifth or fourth century BCE. This chapter belongs to the section focusing on the kingdom of Judah until its destruction by the Babylonians under Nebuchadnezzar and the beginning of restoration under Cyrus the Great of Persia  (2 Chronicles 10 to 36). The focus of this chapter is the reigns of Ahaziah and Athaliah, rulers of Judah.

Text
This chapter was originally written in the Hebrew language and is divided into 12 verses.

Textual witnesses
Some early manuscripts containing the text of this chapter in Hebrew are of the Masoretic Text tradition, which includes the Aleppo Codex (10th century), and Codex Leningradensis (1008).

There is also a translation into Koine Greek known as the Septuagint, made in the last few centuries BCE. Extant ancient manuscripts of the Septuagint version include Codex Vaticanus (B; B; 4th century), and Codex Alexandrinus (A; A; 5th century).

Old Testament references
: 
: 
:

Ahaziah, king of Judah (22:1–9)
The section contains the record of Ahaziah's reign, with some events in the northern kingdom mentioned as necessary. Verses 1–6 correspond with 2 Kings 8:24b–29, whereas verses 7–9 are concise parallels to 2 Kings 9:1–28 and 10:12–14.  Uniquely in verse 1, Ahaziah was said to be made king by the "people of Jerusalem", while elsewhere in the Hebrew Bible involving the "people of the land".  It refers back to 2 Chronicles 21:17 for the explanation why the youngest of all Jehoram's sons should become king. The alliance with the northern kingdom and the emulation of its worship practices in Ahaziah's time threatened the elimination of Davidic dynasty as well as the traditional Temple worship practice in Jerusalem (2 Chronicles 23:18; 24:7). Verse 9 provides another point of view concerning Ahaziah's death in comparison to 1 Kings 9 which recorded that Ahaziah was wounded while fleeing near Ibleam, but reached Megiddo, where he died, whereas the Chronicler only records that Ahaziah died in Samaria, the 'evil capital'. The Chronicler does not explicitly confirm that Ahaziah was buried is Samaria, only that he received a burial for the sake of his God-fearing ancestor, Jehoshaphat, so it is not a contradiction to the statement in 1 Kings 9 that Ahaziah's dead body was brought to Jerusalem to be buried there. The anointing of Jehu and the assassination of Joram, king of Israel were described in 2 Kings 9:1–26.

Verse 2
Ahaziah was forty-two years old when he became king, and he reigned one year in Jerusalem. His mother’s name was Athaliah the granddaughter of Omri.
 Cross reference: 2 Kings 8:26
The form is for the most part signify a person's age, but not always (cf. ), which is the case here, because 2 Kings 8:26 records Ahaziah's age as 22 years old, and Jehoram, his father, died at 40 years old. McFall assumes that the Chronicler counts Ahaziah's period of reign as a part of Omri's dynasty (not in the tradition of David's dynasty), by adding Omri's 6 years reign, Ahab's 22 years and Joram's 12 years to Ahaziah's 2 years for a total of 42 years. Some manuscripts of Greek Septuagint and Syriac version read "22 years" as in 2 Kings 8.
"Granddaughter": from Hebrew , bat, literally "daughter"; can also refer to "granddaughter" as here.

Athaliah, queen of Judah (22:10–12)
Entering this section, Ahaziah and the Judean princes ("sons of Ahaziah's brothers"; verse 8) have been murdered, so the kingdom of Judah was in a similar situation to that at the end of Saul's reign (cf. 1 Chronicles 10), giving a significant meaning to the promise for David (cf. 2 Chronicles 23:3).

Verse 10
But when Athaliah the mother of Ahaziah saw that her son was dead, she arose and destroyed all the seed royal of the house of Judah.
Cross reference: 2 Kings 11:1
"Destroyed all the seed royal": Athaliah was certainly angered by the massacre of her royal family (Ahab's family) by Jehu in the northern kingdom of Israel, and knowing Jehu's commission to extirpate the whole of Ahab's posterity, she expected to be the next target, so she resolved, as her defense and security, to take over the throne and destroy "the seed royal" of Davidic line, because they were against the Phoenician worship of Baal, that she was determined to keep, and because, if any of the young princes became king, his mother would replace Athaliah as the queen mother.

Verse 11
But Jehoshabeath, the daughter of the king, took Joash the son of Ahaziah, and stole him away from among the king’s sons who were being murdered, and put him and his nurse in a bedroom. So Jehoshabeath, the daughter of King Jehoram, the wife of Jehoiada the priest (for she was the sister of Ahaziah), hid him from Athaliah so that she did not kill him.
Cross reference: 2 Kings 11:2
The unique information in the Chronicles that Jehoram's daughter Jehoshabeath (spelled as "Jehosheba" in 2 Kings 11) was the wife of Jehioada, the high priest could be historically reliable, despite the lack of support elsewhere in the Hebrew BIble, and it can explain why she could stay in the temple grounds.

See also
 
Related Bible parts: 2 Kings 8, 2 Kings 9, 2 Kings 10, 2 Kings 11, 2 Chronicles 21

Notes

References

Sources

 
 Thiele, Edwin R., The Mysterious Numbers of the Hebrew Kings, (1st ed.; New York: Macmillan, 1951; 2d ed.; Grand Rapids: Eerdmans, 1965; 3rd ed.; Grand Rapids: Zondervan/Kregel, 1983).

External links
 Jewish translations:
 Divrei Hayamim II - II Chronicles - Chapter 22 (Judaica Press) in Hebrew and English translation [with Rashi's commentary] at Chabad.org
 Christian translations:
 Online Bible at GospelHall.org (ESV, KJV, Darby, American Standard Version, Bible in Basic English)
 2 Chronicles Chapter 22. Bible Gateway

22